Yanukovych  is a Belarusian surname and a patronymic of Yan ("John"). Notable people with the surname include:

Viktor Yanukovych's family
Viktor Yanukovych (born 1950) is a Ukrainian politician of Belarusian, Polish and Russian descent who served as 4th President of Ukraine from 2010 until his overthrow in the 2014 Ukrainian Revolution.
Oleksandr Yanukovych (born 1973), Ukrainian Businessman
Viktor Viktorovych Yanukovych (1981-2015), Ukrainian politician

References

Belarusian-language surnames